SS Grampian was a transatlantic ocean liner that was built in Scotland in 1907 and scrapped in the Netherlands in 1925. She was operated originally by Allan Line, and later by Canadian Pacific Steamships. In the First World War she remained in commercial service but carried Canadian troops. In 1919 she survived a collision with an iceberg. In 1921 she was gutted by fire while being refitted. The refit was abandoned, and in 1925–26 she was scrapped.

Building and equipment
In 1907 Alexander Stephen and Sons built a pair of sister ships for Allan Line in Linthouse, Glasgow. Grampian was yard number 422. She was launched on July 25, 1907 and completed later that year. Her sister Hesperian was yard number 425. She was launched on December 20, 1907 and completed in 1908.

She had berths for 1,460 passengers: 210 first class, 250 second class and 1,000 third class.

Grampian had twin screws, each driven by a three-cylinder triple expansion engine.

Allan Line registered Grampian at Glasgow. Her UK official number was 124220 and her code letters were HLKW. In 1907 she made her maiden voyage from Glasgow to Montreal via Quebec.

By 1910 Grampian had been equipped for submarine signalling and wireless telegraphy. The Marconi Company supplied and operated her wireless. Her call sign was MRN.

First World War
In the First World War, Grampian remained in commercial service, but carried members of the Canadian Expeditionary Force from Canada to Europe. In 1915 a U-boat torpedoed her sister ship Hesperian in the Western Approaches, killing 32 people. Hesperian was taken in tow, but sank two days later.

In 1917 Canadian Pacific took over Allan Line. Grampian remained in Allan Line ownership, and registered in Glasgow, but was now managed by Canadian Pacific.

Iceberg

In July 1919 Grampian was on an eastbound voyage from Montreal to Liverpool, carrying 750 passengers and a crew of 350. It was too close to avoid a collision, so her Master decided to hit the iceberg head-on.

But the damage did not extend below her waterline, and the iceberg was prevented from scraping down the side of her hull, which could have ruptured enough watertight compartments to sink her. She diverted to St John's, Newfoundland for emergency repairs.

Grampian was given a temporary timber bow to enable her to reach a port she could receive permanent repairs.

Refit and fire
In 1921 Grampian was in Antwerp being refitted. On March 14 she caught fire and was badly damaged. Her owners abandoned the ship to her underwriters. She was scrapped in the Netherlands, but sources differ as to when and where. One states that it was in July 1925 at Hendrik-Ido-Ambacht. Another states that it was by F Rysdyk in Rotterdam in 1926.

See also
List of ships sunk by icebergs

References

Bibliography

External links

1907 ships
1910s in Newfoundland
1919 in Canada
Maritime incidents in 1919
Maritime incidents in 1921
Passenger ships of the United Kingdom
Ships built in Glasgow
Ship collisions with icebergs
Ship fires
Steamships of the United Kingdom
World War I passenger ships of the United Kingdom